Lewis University is a private Lasallian university in Romeoville, Illinois. It enrolls around 6,800 students in more than 80 undergraduate programs, 22 graduate programs, and accelerated programs for working adults.

History
Lewis University was founded in 1932 by the Archdiocese of Chicago and Bishop Bernard J. Scheil as the Holy Name Technical School. The school gets its name from philanthropist Frank J. Lewis who funded the construction of many of the school's buildings. During these early days, aviation technology courses were chosen as the special emphasis of instruction, becoming the origin of today's highly regarded Department of Aviation and Transportation Studies. The school was incorporated in 1934 under the name Lewis Holy Name Technical School. In 1935, it became Lewis Holy Name School of Aeronautics, a name which is engraved in stone on the building now known as the Philip Lynch Theatre at the Oremus Fine Arts Center.

During World War II, normal classes were suspended as the campus was given to the United States Navy to train pilots. The campus is adjacent to the Lewis University Airport. Regular classes resumed in late 1944 and the college soon adopted a more traditional arts and science curriculum. Women were admitted for the first time in 1949. Three years later, the school's name was changed to the Lewis College of Science and Technology. The institution's name was shortened to simply Lewis College in 1962 and finally received its current name of Lewis University in 1973.

In 2004 and 2005, Lewis enrolled more than 5,000 total students. In 2019, Lewis University offered more than 80 undergraduate majors and programs of study, an accelerated degree completion option for working adults, various aviation programs, and 35 graduate programs. The university also offers degree programs in Albuquerque, New Mexico.

In 2016, David J. Livingston, former president of Lourdes University in Sylvania, Ohio, succeeded James Gaffney as the 10th president of the university. Gaffney retired after 28 years of leadership and service to Lewis University and its students.

Organization 
 College of Aviation, Science and Technology
 College of Business
 College of Education and Social Sciences
 College of Humanities, Fine Arts and Communications
 College of Nursing and Health Sciences
 School of Graduate, Professional and Continuing Education

Athletics 

The Lewis athletic teams called are the Flyers. The university is a member of the Division II level of the National Collegiate Athletic Association (NCAA), primarily competing in the Great Lakes Valley Conference (GLVC) for most of its sports since the 1980–81 academic year; while its men's volleyball team compete in the Midwestern Intercollegiate Volleyball Association (MIVA). Since it is not a sponsored sport at the Division II level, the men's volleyball team is the only program that plays in Division I.

Prior to joining the NCAA, Lewis was a member of the National Association of Intercollegiate Athletics (NAIA), primarily competing in the Chicagoland Collegiate Athletic Conference (CCAC) from 1954–55 to 1979–80.

Lewis competes in 22 intercollegiate varsity sports: Men's sports include baseball, basketball, bowling, cross country, golf, lacrosse, soccer, swimming, tennis, track & field and volleyball; while women's sports include basketball, bowling, cross country, golf, lacrosse, soccer, softball, swimming, tennis, track & field and volleyball.

Men's volleyball
The men's volleyball team is the only program that plays in Division I. In 2003 the men's volleyball team won the NCAA Division I/II National Collegiate Men's Volleyball Championship by defeating Brigham Young University, but it later voluntarily gave back its title after an internal investigation found ineligibility issues that had been kept from the NCAA. The program has climbed their way back into the Top-10 rankings of DI-II schools. The Flyers qualified for the NCAA Championship and participated in the 1998 Final Four. In 1998 the Flyers also won their conference title. The Flyers were runners-up to Loyola University Chicago in the 2015 NCAA Final.

Women's volleyball
The women's volleyball team has qualified for 16 straight NCAA Regional Championships, having made it to the final 4 in 2018

Track & field/cross country
The men's and women's track and field and cross country teams have had a long history of success, with 85 athletes being awarded All-American since 1988. Alum Isaac Jean-Paul, who won an NCAA Championship in the HJ, went on to win a World Championship in the Paralympics High jump in 2017 in London, jumping a world record 2.17m.

Baseball
As a member of the NAIA, the Flyers won the NAIA Baseball World Series from 1974 to 76, and finished as runners-up in 1966 and 1980.

Club sports
Lewis has many club sports as well, such as hockey and rugby.

Notable alumni

Arts, culture and entertainment
 Kay Cannon, wrote the screenplay for the Pitch Perfect movies, directed Blockers, 2021 Cinderella, 2010 Emmy nominee for Outstanding Writing in a Comedy Series (30 Rock), actress and improvisational performer
 John Caponera, television actor and comedian
 Chaka Khan, real name Yvette Marie Stevens, performer and eight-time Grammy award-winning artist; four-time American Music Award-winning artist; BET Lifetime Achievement Award winner
 John Loprieno, television actor in One Life to Live, Search for Tomorrow, and As the World Turns

Government, law, politics and activism
 James Laski, former Chicago City Clerk, controversial talk radio host, and author of My Fall From Grace — From City Hall to Prison Walls
 Edward Maloney, former member of the Illinois Senate
 Tim McCarthy, former Chief of Police of Orland Park, Illinois; former member of the United States Secret Service. During the 1981 Reagan assassination attempt, he turned into the line of fire, shielded Ronald Reagan, and was wounded from one of John Hinckley, Jr.'s bullets.
 Paul Modrowski, earned his degree while in Stateville Correctional Center; currently writes a blog from prison
 Tom O'Halleran, member of the United States House of Representatives, representing Arizona's 1st congressional district
 Charles H. Ramsey, Commissioner of the Philadelphia Police Department (2008–present); Chief of the Metropolitan Police Department of the District of Columbia (1998–2006)
 Arthur Turner, member and Deputy Majority Leader of the Illinois House of Representatives
 Julia Tukai Zvobgo, Zimbabwean activist and politician

Science, technology and medicine
 Michael H. Wynn, podiatrist responsible for the development of the CO2 laser technique for the treatment of bunions

Sports
 Jenny Bindon, goalkeeper for the New Zealand women's football team at the 2007 and 2011 Women's World Cup, the 2008 Summer Olympics in Beijing, and the 2012 Summer Olympics in London
John Dolinsky, German-American soccer player who played professionally in the Major Indoor Soccer League, American Soccer League, United Soccer League and American Indoor Soccer Association
 J. J. Furmaniak, professional MLB baseball player with the Tampa Bay Rays
 Rick Huisman, professional MLB baseball player with the Kansas City Royals
 Kristle Lowell, 2013 Team USA World Champion trampoline gymnast
 Wayne Molis, NBA center/forward (New York Knicks)
 George Schmidt, NFL Player for the 1952 Green Bay Packers and 1953 Chicago Cardinals
 Ed Spiezio, former third baseman in Major League Baseball who played from 1964 through 1972 for the St. Louis Cardinals, San Diego Padres and Chicago White Sox
 Paul Stevens, college baseball coach at University of Chicago
 Ernie Young, baseball player with the Oakland A's and San Diego Padres

Campus media 
 The Lewis Flyer
 WLRA (88.1 FM)

See also
Fitzpatrick House (Lockport, Illinois)

References

External links 
 
 Official athletics website

 
Lasallian colleges and universities
Educational institutions established in 1932
Association of Catholic Colleges and Universities
Midwestern Intercollegiate Volleyball Association
Education in Will County, Illinois
Buildings and structures in Will County, Illinois
Romeoville, Illinois
Catholic universities and colleges in Illinois
Roman Catholic Diocese of Joliet in Illinois
Aviation schools in the United States
1932 establishments in Illinois